

Pacific Air Holdings 
Pacific Air Holdings is an American aircraft leasing company based in Shawnee, Oklahoma, United States. 
The company moved from Mesa Arizona in 2015 and now operates from a 26000 sq ft hangar which they built in 2017 at the KSNL airport.

Pacific Air Holdings owns aircraft in the United States, the Middle East, the Caribbean, the West Indies, and the Asian Pacific.

Subsidiaries

Aero Wing Equipment
Bravo Wing Equipment
Delta Wing Equipment

www.pacificairholdings.com

References

Companies based in Oklahoma